Toll-like receptor 5, also known as TLR5, is a protein which in humans is encoded by the TLR5 gene. It is a member of the toll-like receptor (TLR) family. TLR5 is known to recognize bacterial flagellin from invading mobile bacteria. It has been shown to be involved in the onset of many diseases, which includes Inflammatory bowel disease. Recent studies have also shown that malfunctioning of TLR5 is likely related to rheumatoid arthritis, osteoclastogenesis, and bone loss. Abnormal TLR5 functioning is related to the onset of gastric, cervical, endometrial and ovarian cancers.

Function 

The TLR family plays a fundamental role in pathogen recognition and activation of innate immunity. TLRs are highly conserved from Drosophila to humans and share structural and functional similarities. They recognize pathogen-associated molecular patterns (PAMPs) that are expressed on infectious agents, and mediate the production of cytokines necessary for the development of effective immunity. The various TLRs exhibit different patterns of expression. TLR5 is expressed on both immune and non-immune cells. TLR5 recognizes bacterial flagellin, a principal component of bacterial flagella and a virulence factor. The activation of this receptor mobilizes the nuclear factor NF-κB and stimulates tumor necrosis factor-alpha production.

TLR5 recognizes flagellin, which is the protein monomer that makes up the filament of bacterial flagella, found on nearly all motile bacteria. There are highly conserved regions in the flagellin protein among all bacteria, facilitating the recognition of flagellin by a germ-line encoded receptor such as TLR5. However, some Proteobacteria flagella have acquired mutations preventing their recognition by TLR5.

Signaling pathway and regulation 

The TLR5 signaling cascade is commonly triggered by the binding of bacterial flagellum to TLR5 on the cell surface. Binding of flagellum induces the dimerization of TLR5, which in turn recruits MyD88 and Mal/TIRAP. The recruitment of MyD88 leads to subsequent activation of IRAK4, IRAK1, TRAF6, and eventually IκB kinases. Activation of IκB kinases contributes to the nuclear localization of NF-κB (a proinflammatory cytokine). NF-κB induces many downstream gene expressions, which initiates the canonical proinflammatory pathway. This TLR5/flagellum interaction results in different responses in difference cell types. In epithelial cells, binding of flagellum to TLR5 induces IL8 production. In human monocytes and dendritic cells, this interaction results in the secretion of proinflammatory cytokines such as TNF.

Recent study has identified Caveolin-1 as a potential regulator of TLR5 expression. In contrast to the decreased TLR4 level in senescent cells, TLR5 expression maintains relatively stable during the aging process, which is correlated with the high level of Caveolin-1 in aging cells. Data from Caveolin-1 knockout mice demonstrated that TLR5 expression significantly decreases in the absence of Caveolin-1 expression in aging cells. It is hypothesized that the Caveolin-1 directly interacts with TLR5 to stabilize it and hence increases the level of TLR5.

Clinical significance

Inflammatory bowel disease 

TLR5 may play a role in inflammatory bowel disease (IBD). TLR5-deficient mice develop spontaneous colitis  and metabolic syndrome which are associated with altered gut microbiota.
Statistically significant lower levels of TLR5 expression have been found in patients exhibiting moderate to severe ulcerative colitis (UC). In these patients, lower TLR5 mRNA levels were found along with decreased immunoreactivity of TLR5 in the inflamed mucosa of UC patients.

Osteoclastogenesis and bone loss 

Bone loss and osteoclastogenesis are induced by inflammation in infectious and autoimmune diseases. A recent study has identified TLR5 as a novel mediator in the process of inflammation-induced bone loss and osteoclastogenesis. Flagellin, which is a TLR5-activating ligand, is present in synovial fluid from patients with rheumatoid arthritis. Activation of TLR5 in these patients leads to subsequent activation of receptor activator of NF-κB ligand (RANKL). Activation of RANKL leads to increased expression of osteoclastic genes. Activation of these genes results in robust osteoclast formation and bone loss. This process is absent in TLR5 knockout mice model.

Cancer

Gastric 
Chronic inflammation in GI tract has been known to increase the risk of gastric cancer, with H. pylori being one of the most common resources of infection. TLR5 is an essential factor in inducing inflammatory response to H. pylori infection. During infection, expression and ligation of TLR5 and TLR2 are required for the activation of proinflammatory cytokines such as NF-κB. However, TLR5 interaction with H. pylori only induces weak TLR5 activation. The inflammatory response induced by TLR5 during H. pylori is also considered to be possibly flagellin independent. This suggests that an unknown H. pylori factor is responsible for this response In addition to inflammation induction, TLR5 is also shown to enhance gastric cancer cell proliferation through an ERK-dependent pathway. This is supported by the increased level of TLR5 expression from normal gastric mucosa to gastric cancer cells.

Cervical 
TLR5 is suggested to be possibly involved in HPV induced inflammation and subsequent cervical neoplasia formation. TLR5 is generally absent in normal cervical squamous epithelium. However, a gradually increased level of TLR5 expression has been detected in low-grade cervical intraepithelial neoplasia (CIN), high grade CIN, and invasive cervical cancer. However, the exact mechanism of interaction between TLR5 and HPV is not known.

Ovarian 
It has been reported that TLR5 expression is detected in both ovarian epithelium and ovarian cancer cell lines but not in ovarian stroma, suggesting a possible role of TLR5 in inflammation induced ovarian cancer onset.

References

Further reading

External links 
 

5
LRR proteins